Thalayazham is a small village located in Vaikom Taluk, Kottayam district, Kerala, India.

Demographics
As of 2001 India census, Thalayazham had a population of 20,171 with 9,923 males and 10,248 females.

References

Villages in Kottayam district